Kęstutis Marčiulionis (born April 4, 1977) is a Lithuanian basketball player.  He is a 6'2" (1.88 m) point guard.

Kęstutis Marčiulionis played NCAA collegiate basketball at the University of Delaware in the United States. He has represented his home country in several international competitions, most notably the 2000 Summer Olympics, where he won a bronze medal.

Marčiulionis also played high school basketball for Huguenot Academy, a small private school located in Powhatan County, Virginia, during its 1994–1995 season.

Professional clubs
 1993–1994: BC Žalgiris
 1994–1995: Huguenot Academy
 1995–1996: Hargrave Military Academy
 1996–2000: University of Delaware
 2000–2001: BC Žalgiris
 2001–2002: BC Lietuvos Rytas
 2002–2003: Idea Śląsk Wrocław
 2003: BC Bremerhaven
 2003: BC Atletas
 2004: Astoria Bydgoszcz
 2004–2005: Anwil Wloclawek
 2005–2006: BC Kaposvár
 2006–2007: BC Albacomp
 2007–2008: CB Mallorquí
 2008–2009: BC Kaposvár
 2009-2010: BC Kecskemét
 2011-2012: Volukte Kaunas

References

External links
Player profile

1976 births
Living people
Alba Fehérvár players
Astoria Bydgoszcz players
Basketball players at the 2000 Summer Olympics
Basketball players from Kaunas
Bàsquet Mallorca players
BC Rytas players
Delaware Fightin' Blue Hens men's basketball players
KK Włocławek players
Lithuanian expatriate basketball people in Germany
Lithuanian expatriate basketball people in Hungary
Lithuanian expatriate basketball people in Poland
Lithuanian expatriate basketball people in Spain
Lithuanian expatriate basketball people in the United States
Lithuanian men's basketball players
Medalists at the 2000 Summer Olympics
Olympic basketball players of Lithuania
Olympic bronze medalists for Lithuania
Olympic medalists in basketball
Point guards